Damour is a surname. Notable people with the surname include:

Alexis Damour (1808–1902), French mineralogist
Lisa Damour (born 1970), American psychologist
Loïc Damour (born 1991), French footballer
Thibault Damour (born 1951), French physicist

See also
D'Amour